is a railway station on the Nippō Main Line operated by Kyūshū Railway Company in Nakatsu, Ōita, Japan.

Lines

Layout 
The station consists of two side platforms serving two tracks. Both tracks run on the north side of their respective platforms, suggesting that platform 2 was once an island platform but the middle line has been removed. A siding branches off each track. The station building is a wooden structure of traditional Japanese design and houses a staffed ticket window, a waiting area, an automatic ticket vending machine, a SUGOCA charge station and a SUGOCA card reader. Access to the opposite side platform is by means of a footbridge.

JR Kyushu ceased to staff the station in March 2015. Thereafter, Nakatsu City authorities managed the ticket window on a kan'i itaku basis.

Adjacent stations

History
The Hōshū Railway was acquired by the Kyushu Railway on 3 September 1901 and the Kyushu Railway was itself nationalised on 1 July 1907, whereupon Japanese Government Railways (JGR) assumed control of the station. It was designated it as part of the Hōshū Main Line on 12 October 1909 and then as part of the Nippō Main Line on 15 December 1923. With the privatization of Japanese National Railways (JNR), the successor of JGR, on 1 April 1987, the station came under the control of JR Kyushu.

Passenger statistics
In fiscal 2015, there were a total of 111,687 boarding passengers, giving a daily average of 306 passengers.

See also
List of railway stations in Japan

References

External links

  

Railway stations in Ōita Prefecture
Railway stations in Japan opened in 1901
Nakatsu, Ōita